Synergy Institute of Engineering & Technology (SIET) is a private engineering college in Dhenkanal, Odisha. It was founded by Shivani Educational and Charitable trust in 1999. With the approval of All India Council for Technical Education, it was affiliated by Utkal University, Vanivihar, Bhubaneshwar. Later it affiliated with Biju Patnaik University of Technology in the year 2003–04.

College Campus 

The campus is situated at Banamali Prasad in the district headquarters of Dhenkanal, Orissa. It has a main college building, Kapilash Boys hostel, Saptasajjya Boys Hostel, Shantiniketan Girls Hostel and Kohinoor Boys Hostel. It has a Central Library, a basketball ground, a football/volleyball ground, cafeteria (college canteen).

Undergraduate courses 
Synergy Institute of Engineering & Technology has Dept. of Physics, Dept. of Chemistry, Dept. of Mathematics, Language Center & Dept. of Management. It provides B.Tech in following disciplines: 
 B.Tech in Electronics & Telecommunication
 B.Tech in Computer Science & Engineering
 B.Tech in Mechanical Engineering
 B.Tech in Electrical Engineering
 B.tech in Civil Engineering

Postgraduate courses 
 M.Tech in Electronics & Telecommunication
 M.Tech in Computer Science & Engineering
 M.Tech in Mechanical Engineering
 M.Tech in Electrical Engineering

References

External links 
 
 BPUT colleges list from BPUT

All India Council for Technical Education
Private engineering colleges in India
Engineering colleges in Odisha
Colleges affiliated with Biju Patnaik University of Technology
Dhenkanal district
Educational institutions established in 1999
1999 establishments in Orissa